The Ambassador of Croatia in Washington, D. C. is the extraordinary and plenipotentiary representative of the Government of the Republic of Croatia in Zagreb to the Government of the United States. Diplomatic relations between the two countries were established in 1992 and the first Croatian ambassador to the United States was Petar A. Šarčević.

List of diplomatic representatives of Croatia to the United States (1992-)

Source of list:

References 

 
United States
Croatia